Val Astaire is an American alternative rock act created by multi-instrumentalist, singer, songwriter Brian Anthony Joyce.

Early life 
Brian Anthony Joyce was born in Philadelphia, Pennsylvania on March 3, 1989. His interest in music began while watching his father play guitar when he was 8 years old, and attending concerts with his mother. He began recording his own music when he was 13 after his father purchased him a cassette recorder.

After dropping out of college in his late teens, he formed the pop-punk band Major League (band); which saw the success of 2 EP's and 2 full-length records, as well as multiple national and international tours.

Music career

Creation, /// & yellow EP's (2017 - 2018)

After disbanding Major League in 2016, the moniker of Val Astaire was created. Having idolized androgynous figures such as David Bowie and Prince, he believed it was more about the artistry than the person behind it. Shortly after he met songwriter and producer Christopher Curran, who helped to shape the sound and direction of the project.

His debut single as Val Astaire, "Blow", was released in February 2017.
His second single "The No Funs" was released in early 2018.

Val went on to release his debut EP, Yellow, which featured singles "Fall Apart" and "Rebel" in October 2018. Shortly after, he embarked on a United Kingdom and Ireland tour, followed by a winter east coast and midwest US tour to close 2018.

In January 2019, he re-released his first 3 songs that he recorded in an EP titled / / /, which included "Blow", "The No Funs" and "Runway Love".

Val Astaire played Delaware's 93.7WSTW’s Snow Jam in February 2019 alongside artists O.A.R. and Whitney Woerz.

Fever Dreams (2019 - 2020)

In March 2019, Val Astaire entered the studio to record his first full length album at ‘Barber Shop Studios’, and released his first single "Say You Will" along with an accompanying music video in September 2019. The song is a notable contrast from his earlier work, with Atwood Magazine commenting on his "undeniable emotion" and "impressive veracity", and It's All Indie noting his "youthful vocals and talents as a songwriter".

On March 4, 2020, Astaire announced his debut album Fever Dreams, which was released on July 17, 2020. It includes singles "Say You Will, "Kiss", "3am", "When The Lights Go Out" and "Runner".

Bad Vibrations (2021)

In June of 2021, Val Astaire released his single Bad Vibrations, with The Honey Pop referring to the song as a "soundtrack to the Summer" and praising the passion and purity of the track.

TBD LP2 (2022 - 2023)
In August of 2022, Val Astaire began teasing the next era of his project, announcing his next single, HOW'S IT GOING TO END? on Twitter, which was released along with a music video on August 12, 2022.

The song was quickly followed up by the announcement of his next single HIGH ON YOU in October, which was released on November 4, 2022.

In early 2023, Val began teasing his next single by posting a cryptic phone number for fans to call. The phone number led to an audio recording stating welcome to the future. His next single HELL TO PAY was announced on February 14, 2023, and was released along with a music video on March 3, 2023.

Musical style 
Val Astaire's musical style has been described as alternative rock and indie pop, and has cited as musical and career influences David Bowie, The 1975, Tears For Fears, The Neighbourhood, Alanis Morissette and Prince.

Discography

Albums 
- Fever Dreams, (2020)

Extended plays 
- Yellow, (2018) 
- / / /, (2019)

Singles

Music videos

References

External links
 

1989 births
Living people
Musicians from Philadelphia